Haitian Creole is a French-based creole spoken in Haiti, on the western three-eighths of the island known as Hispaniola. The façon de parler (manner of speaking) is a result of the gradual change of the French dialect of Franco-European colonists by African and Creole slaves (African slaves native to the island). This change includes the speaking of French vocabulary in an African (Fon) syntax.

As well as the addition of a pluralization marker like the Fongbe word le.

{| class="wikitable"
|-
!Standard French
!Fongbe
!Haitian Creole
|-
|Mes bécanes (my bikes)
|Keke che le (my bikes)
|Bekàn mwen yo (my bikes)
|}

This practice of using a pluralizing marker can also be found in Jamaican (English) Patois.

The gradual abbreviation of the early French patois also included the shortening of certain French phrases into tense markers such as:

M ape manje / M ap manje - I'm eating (Which comes from the Old Phrase: Je suis après manger, creolized as Moi après manger, Then: Mouen apé manjé, also appearing as: M ape manje, M ap manje or Mwen ap manje). Ape comes from the phrase: être après;  the abbreviated form ap is more common.

In addition to the African syntax and the use of tense and pluralizing markers, a practice of West African languages, Haitian Creole also has a considerable amount of lexical Items from many languages, most notably from various West African languages, Old and Norman French, Taino, Spanish and Portuguese amongst others (English, Arab etc.). These entered Creole through interaction between various people who spoke these languages from colonial times to modern time.

Numbers

[]: another way of writing it, with a similar or identical pronunciation

Colours

(): short form

Time and Date

Time and Date

Days of the week

Months of the year

Seasons

Verbs

Adjectives

Opinion and personality

Quantitative

Sport

People and family

Family

People

Profession

Feelings

Religion

Country

Country

History

Economy

Security

World

Countries

Continents

Directions

Nature

Nature

Plants

Parts of a plant

Flowers

Trees

Parts of a tree

Weather

Minerals and metals

Animals

Domestic animals

Wild animals

Marine animals

Birds

Insects

Space

State of matter

Foods

Foods of the day

Flavors

Cooking method

Alimentary groups

Cereals

Meats and legumes

Dairy products

Oils and fats

Others

Fruits, vegetables, grains and legumes

Fruits

Nuts

Vegetables

Grains and legumes

Beverages

City and places

City

Places

Transport

School

School

Reading and language

Maths

Geometry

Measures and sizes

Music

Science

House

House

Kitchen

Bathroom

Tools

Rural

Clothing

Body

Body

Hand

Head

Senses of the body

Health

Health

Disease

Other words

Creole words of African origin

Akasan // From Edo – Akasan // n. corn pudding Akra n. a malanga fritterAnasi // From Asante – Ananse // n. a spider (The French derived term is, zarenyen)Bòkò // From Fongbe – Bokono // n. a sorcerer (The French derived term is, sósié)Chouk // From Fulani – Chuk // v. to pierce, to poke / n. a poke (The French derived term is, piké)Chouc-chouc // From Fulani – Chuk // v. to have sexManbo // From Kikongo – Mambu + Fongbe – Nanbo // n. a Vaudou priestessMarasa // From Kikongo – Mabasa // n. twins (The French derived term is)Ouanga/Wanga n. a Vaudou charm or relicOungan // From Fongbe // n. a Vaudou priestOunsi // From Fongbe // n. a VaudouisantZonbi //From Kikongo – Nzumbi // n. a ghost, a soulless corpse or living dead

Creole words of Old French originAp // OFr. Être après // - present tense marker (the more common and abbreviated form of the word, apé)Ape // OFr. Être après // - present tense markerGouye // Norman Fr. Griller – to slide, to slip // v. to gyrate (one’s waist), to have sexPral // OFr. Être après aller // adj. To be going to / - future tense markerRele / Yele / Ele // OFr. Héler // v. to call, to yellT ap // OFr. Avoir esté après // - Imperfect tense markerTe // OFr. Avoir esté // - Past tense marker

Creole words of Taino originAnakaona // Ana kaona – Gold flower // n. a very beautiful womanAnana n. a pineapple (Became part of standard French)Ayiti n. HaitiBabako // Barbakoa – A Taino roasting process // n. a feastBoyo // Bohio – Home, house // n. HaitiKako // Buticaco or Heiticaco // n. a bumpkin, someone from the countrysideKalalou n. okra, also a soup that includes okra and crab among other ingredients, known as gumbo in LouisianaKanari  n. a clay jugKolibri n. a humming bird (Became part of standard French, it is also called, zoizo ouanga or ouanga négès)Koukouy // Kokuyo // n. a fireflyKounouk // Konuko // n. a shackLanbi/Lambi n. conch, a conch shellMabi n. a type of drinkMabouya // Mabuya – a Ghost, evil spirit // n. a lizardSanba/Sanmba n. a musician or poet

Creole words of English originBokit // n. bucketKannistè // n. tin can
</ref>

Creole words of Portuguese originBa // Dar – to give // v. to giveKachimbo n. a pipe used for smoking tobaccoMantèg // Manteiga // n. lard, butter (The French derived term for butter is, bé / beu)Pikini // Pequenino // n. a child (The more common French derived terms are, pitit & timoun)Tchipe/Tchwipe / Tchupé // Chupar – to suck // v. to suck one’s teeth (at)

Creole words of Spanish originBosal // Bozal // adj. to be savage (The French derived term is, sovaj)Tchakleta // Chancleta // n. a certain type of sandal

In Haitian creole the Spanish suffix -ador (pronounced in Creole as adò) is sometimes placed in combination with a French verb to describe someone who performs a certain action.Abladò // Hablador // n. a speaker (person), someone who talks a lotBabiadò / Babyadò // Fr. Babiller + Sp. –ador // n. a constant complainerBliyadò // Fr. Blier + Sp. -ador // n. a forgetful personKouchadò'' // Fr. Coucher + Sp. –ador // n. a sleepyhead, one who sleeps a lot

References

External links 

Haitian Creole materials from the Institute of Haitian Studies at the University of Kansas - Complete pdf versions of books created by Bryant C. Freeman, PhD, as well as the accompanying mp3 audio supplements.
Microsoft Translator supporting Haitian Creole. Since Carnegie Mellon began to make the data on Haitian Creole publicly available (see external link below), a team at Microsoft Research used it to help develop an experimental, web-based system for translating between English and Haitian Creole.
Public release of Haitian Creole language data by Carnegie Mellon. In response to the humanitarian crisis in Haiti, scientists at Carnegie Mellon University's Language Technologies Institute (LTI) publicly released spoken and textual data they've compiled on Haitian Creole so that translation tools desperately needed by doctors, nurses and other relief workers on the earthquake-ravaged island could be rapidly developed.
HMBC - A website entirely in Haitian creole
Ann pale kreyòl - "Let's speak creole" (Haitian Creole complete course)

Haitian Creole - English, English - Haitian Creole Dictionary
Creole Language and Culture - OpenCourseWare from the University of Notre Dame
UN Declaration of Human Rights in Haitian Creole
Haitian Kréyòl grammar
What is Haitian Creole? (By Hugues St.Fort)
Haitian Creole English Dictionary from Webster's Online Dictionary - The Rosetta Edition
Projects in Haitian Creole

Haitian Creole
Lexis (linguistics)